Düşmeden Bulutlarda Koşmam Gerek is the second album by Turkish rock musician Barış Akarsu. The album was released in 2006 both because of the success of Akarsu's first album and the popularity of his TV series, Yalancı Yarim (My Lying Lover). The only single which is released from the album is "Vurdum En Dibe Kadar". Late copies of the album also contain the song "Gözlerin" (Your Eyes), the popular song of Akarsu's TV series.

Track listing 
Vurdum En Dibe Kadar
Vazgeçme
Yaz Demedim
Adını Çıkar Deliye
Ben
Rapatma (Vira Vira)
Yazdan Kalma
Yalan Dünya
Zümrüt-ü Anka
Yeter Be
Kayboldum
Ben (Acoustic version)
Gözlerin (Bonus Track)

2006 albums
Barış Akarsu albums